Tracholena sulfurosa is a moth of the family Tortricidae. It is known from Australia, including the Australian Capital Territory, Tasmania, Queensland and New South Wales.

The wingspan is about 10 mm. Adults have pale brown forewings with a dark brown marginal half, and a dotted brown line across the pale area. The hindwings are pale brown fading to white at the base.

The larvae feed on various conifers, including Callitris species. They tunnel into the bark of their host plant.

References

Schoenotenini